Tomopterus rufotibialis  is a species of beetle in the family of Cerambycidae. It was described by Zajciw in 1968.

References

Tomopterus
Beetles described in 1968